Lenox Station may refer to:

Lenox station (MARTA), a MARTA train station in Atlanta, Georgia
Lenox Railroad Station, a former train station in Lenox, Massachusetts